Eerie is an American horror comic first published in 1966.

Eerie may also refer to:
 Feeling of creepiness
 Eerie (Avon), a 1947 horror comic 
 Eerie Publications, a publisher of comics magazines
 Eerie, Indiana, a 1991–92 television series
 Eerie, Indiana: The Other Dimension, a 1998 spin-off television series
 The Eeries, a U.S. rock band
 Christina Von Eerie (born 1989), U.S. professional wrestler
 Battle of Hill Eerie, several Korean War battles

See also
 
 
 Erie (disambiguation)
 Eyrie (disambiguation)
 Aerie (disambiguation)